as-Sura is a Palestinian village located fifteen kilometers south-west of Hebron. The village is in the Hebron Governorate Southern West Bank. According to the Palestinian Central Bureau of Statistics, the village had a population of 1,925 in 2007.  The primary health care facilities for the village are obtained at Imreish where they are designated by the Ministry of Health as level 1.

Footnotes

External links
Survey of Western Palestine, Map 21:    IAA, Wikimedia commons
 As Sura Village (fact sheet), Applied Research Institute–Jerusalem, ARIJ
 As Sura village profile, ARIJ
As Sura aerial photo, ARIJ
The priorities and needs for development in As Sura village based on the community and local authorities' assessment, ARIJ

Villages in the West Bank
Hebron Governorate
Municipalities of the State of Palestine